Scutavirus is a genus of viruses in the order Herpesvirales, in the family Herpesviridae, in the subfamily Alphaherpesvirinae. Turtles and tortoises serve as natural hosts. Diseases associated with this genus include fibropapillomatosis.

Species 
The genus consists of the following two species:

 Chelonid alphaherpesvirus 5
 Testudinid alphaherpesvirus 3

Structure 
Viruses in Scutavirus are enveloped, with icosahedral, spherical to pleomorphic, and round geometries, and T=16 symmetry. The diameter is around 150-200 nm.  Genomes are linear and non-segmented.

Life cycle 
Viral replication is nuclear, and is lysogenic. Entry into the host cell is achieved by attachment of the viral gB, gC, gD and gH proteins to host receptors, which mediates endocytosis. Replication follows the dsDNA bidirectional replication model. DNA-templated transcription, with some alternative splicing mechanism is the method of transcription. The virus exits the host cell by nuclear egress, and  budding. Turtles and tortoises serve as the natural host.

References

External links 

 Viralzone: Scutavirus
 ICTV

Alphaherpesvirinae
Virus genera